Sudhir Ray is an Indian politician. He was elected to the Lok Sabha, the lower house of the Parliament of India from the Burdwan constituency of West Bengal in 1984, 1989, 1991 as a member of the Communist Party of India (Marxist).

References

External links
 Official biographical sketch in Parliament of India website

1933 births
Communist Party of India (Marxist) politicians from West Bengal
Lok Sabha members from West Bengal
India MPs 1984–1989
India MPs 1989–1991
India MPs 1991–1996
Living people
People from Bardhaman